Vanessa Grimm (born 22 April 1997) is a German heptathlete.

Grimm recorded a personal best heptathlon score of 6316 on 30 May 2021 at the Mösle-Stadium, Götzis. She also competed in the heptathlon at the 2020 Summer Olympics.

References

1997 births
Living people
German heptathletes
Olympic athletes of Germany
Athletes (track and field) at the 2020 Summer Olympics
20th-century German women
21st-century German women